Forsythe Technology, Inc. is an IT infrastructure, professional services and financial services company located in Skokie, Illinois.

History
The company was founded in 1971 under the name Forsythe McArthur. With $200 in capital and a telephone on a dining room table as an office, founder Rick Forsythe and partner Jim McArthur started the company.  In 1980 Jim McArthur sold his half of the company to Rick Forsythe.  In 1982, Forsythe opened its first two offices to be located outside of Illinois in Georgia and Wisconsin.  In 1988, the employee stock ownership program was established and in 2006 employees purchased the company from Rick Forsythe.  In 2013 Forsythe reported its 43rd consecutive profitable year with revenues of $1.1 billion. In 2015 Forsythe formed the Meta7 division to focus solely on the Oracle Red Stack.

On May 1, 2018, Forsythe was acquired by Sirius Computer Solutions, Inc.

References

External links
Forsythe Technology website
Forsythe FOCUS Magazine website
 Forsythe Data Centers website
 Mentora, a Forsythe Company
 SOS Security, a Forsythe Company
 KillerIT, a division of Forsythe
 Meta7, a division of Forsythe

Information technology companies of the United States
Companies based in Skokie, Illinois
Employee-owned companies of the United States